Douglas Scott Hardcastle (1886 – 9 May 1915) was an English professional footballer who played as an inside left in the Football League for Derby County.

Personal life 
Hardcastle worked as a stove grate patternmaker. He served as an appointed lance corporal in the Sherwood Foresters during the First World War and was killed in action on the Western Front on 9 May 1915. Hardcastle is commemorated on the Ploegsteert Memorial.

Career statistics

References

1886 births
1915 deaths
Footballers from Worksop
English footballers
English Football League players
Association football inside forwards
Worksop Town F.C. players
British Army personnel of World War I
Sherwood Foresters soldiers
British military personnel killed in World War I
Derby County F.C. players
Midland Football League players
Military personnel from Nottinghamshire